Antonio Ramon Díaz Sánchez (born July 14, 1962) is a Cuban dissident. He participated in the gathering of signatures for the Varela project and was a member of the Christian Liberation Movement.

Antonio Díaz Sánchez was imprisoned during the 2003 crackdown on dissidents. Amnesty International declared him a prisoner of conscience.

His wife, Gisela Sanchez Verdecia, was active in the Ladies in White.

In 2010, Díaz Sánchez was exiled to Spain along with nineteen other political prisoners.

References

External links

 Antonio Ramón "Tony" Díaz Sánchez - Human Rights First

1962 births
Amnesty International prisoners of conscience held by Cuba
Cuban dissidents
Cuban democracy activists
Living people
Cuban prisoners and detainees
Place of birth missing (living people)